Defending champions Jiske Griffioen and Aniek van Koot defeated Yui Kamiji and Jordanne Whiley in the final, 6–4, 7–6(8–6) to win the ladies' doubles wheelchair tennis title at the 2013 Wimbledon Championships. It was their third step towards an eventual Grand Slam.

Seeds

  Jiske Griffioen /  Aniek van Koot (champions)
  Marjolein Buis /  Lucy Shuker (semifinals, third place)

Draw

Finals

References
 Draw

Women's Wheelchair Doubles
Wimbledon Championship by year – Wheelchair women's doubles